"Hey Nineteen" is a song by the band Steely Dan from their album Gaucho (1980).

Background 
According to one reviewer's interpretation, the song "was about a middle-aged man's disappointment with a young lover".

The lyrics are about an aging hipster attempting to pick up a girl who is so young that she does not recognize "'Retha Franklin" playing on the stereo. The song closes with the ambiguous line, "The Cuervo Gold, the fine Colombian, make tonight a wonderful thing," leaving the listener to decide whether the narrator is consuming tequila and drugs with the love interest, or if he is in fact alone.

The B-side is a previously unreleased 1974 live version of the song "Bodhisattva", recorded at Santa Monica Civic Auditorium, with drunken host Jerome Aniton.

Charts 
"Hey Nineteen" peaked at number 10 on the Billboard Hot 100 chart in early 1981, number 11 on the Adult Contemporary chart, and number 68 on the R&B Singles chart. With a chart run of 19 weeks, "Hey Nineteen" is tied with "Peg" and "Rikki Don't Lose That Number" for being their longest-running chart hit.

Personnel 
 Donald Fagen – electric piano, synthesizer (solo), vocals
 Walter Becker – bass guitar, guitar
 Hugh McCracken – guitars
 Rick Marotta – drums
 Victor Feldman, Steve Gadd – percussion
 Frank Floyd, Zack Sanders – backup vocals

Chart history

Weekly charts

Year-end charts

References

External links 
 "Hey Nineteen" lyrics at Steely Dan archive.com
 Rashida Jones talks about this song with NPR in the article "How Rashida Jones Found Her Inner Music Nerd"
 

1980 songs
1980 singles
MCA Records singles
Song recordings produced by Gary Katz
Songs written by Donald Fagen
Songs written by Walter Becker
Steely Dan songs